The 1983 World Table Tennis Championships were held in Tokyo. between 28 April–9 May 1983.

Results

Team

Individual

References

External links
ITTF Museum

 
World Table Tennis Championships
World Table Tennis Championships
World Table Tennis Championships
Table tennis competitions in Japan
Table
Sports competitions in Tokyo
World Table Tennis Championships
World Table Tennis Championships
World Table Tennis Championships